William Pett (25 August 1873 – 28 December 1954) was a British cyclist. He won a gold medal at the 1906 Intercalated Games and competed in one event at the 1908 Summer Olympics.

References

External links
 

1873 births
1954 deaths
British male cyclists
Olympic cyclists of Great Britain
Cyclists at the 1906 Intercalated Games
Cyclists at the 1908 Summer Olympics
Sportspeople from Derby
Medalists at the 1906 Intercalated Games